Aaryankavu Kollasangam is a 1969 Indian Malayalam-language film, directed and produced by R. Velappan Nair. The film stars Keralasree Sunny, Khadeeja, Polachira Ramachandran and Santo Krishnan. The film had musical score by B. A. Chidambaranath.

Cast
Keralasree Sunny
Khadeeja
Polachira Ramachandran
Santo Krishnan
Madhavan Nair

Soundtrack
The music was composed by B. A. Chidambaranath and the lyrics were written by Kedamangalam Sadanandan.

References

External links
 

1969 films
1960s Malayalam-language films